Prince Adalbert of Bavaria is the name of:
 Prince Adalbert of Bavaria (1828–1875), ninth child and fourth son of Ludwig I of Bavaria and Therese of Saxe-Hildburghausen
 Prince Adalbert of Bavaria (1886–1970), member of the Bavarian Royal House of Wittelsbach, grandson of the above, historian, author and a German Ambassador to Spain